John Scoble (January 16, 1799 – November 11, 1877) was a Congregational minister, British abolitionist and political figure in Canada West.

Biography

Scoble was born in Kingsbridge, England in 1799 and was educated in Devon and London. 

He was part of the anti-slavery movement in England and was involved in the protests against the apprenticeship system which replaced slavery in the West Indies. In 1837, Joseph Sturge organised a voyage to the West Indies, with who he invited Scoble, Thomas Harvey and Dr. Lloyd to report on the apprenticeship system. While Sturge and Harvey visited most of the British colonies in the West Indies, Scoble and Lloyd were in charge of reporting for British Guiana before returning to England. This voyage resulted in  the publication of The West Indies in 1837  (London: Hamilton, Adams, and Co., 1838) by Sturge, "Letters from the West Indies by Lloyd and later Scoble would deliver a speech at a meeting at the Exeter Hall.  He also was one of the leaders of the anti-indenture movement and published several reports on the indentured workers conditions on plantation in the West Indies.  He helped form the British and Foreign Anti-Slavery Society and served as secretary from 1842 to 1852. 

He also helped revitalize the anti-slavery movement in France, corresponding with people such as François-André Isambert who took an active role in trying to free the French slaves. He was not on good terms, however, with the American anti-slavery advocate William Lloyd Garrison and his followers.

He came to Upper Canada in 1852 to try to assist the British-American Institute of Science and Industry, a vocational school for black people, which was being managed by Josiah Henson, a former fugitive slave. Disputes with trustees of the institute and with Henson interfered with his attempts to reorganize the institute's finances. 
 
In 1860, he helped prevent the deportation of John Anderson, a fugitive slave accused of murder in Missouri. In 1861, Scoble resigned from the board of trustees of the institute. In the end, the property was sold, with the proceeds going towards an integrated school in Chatham. Scoble was elected to the Legislative Assembly of the Province of Canada in West Elgin in 1863 after the election of George Macbeth was declared invalid; he was re-elected in the general election that followed later that year. He supported a decentralized federation in Canada and representation by population. Although reform-oriented, he supported Sir John A. Macdonald's leadership.

Scoble retired from politics in 1867 after failing to attain reelection, and all but disappeared from public life. He died in Ontario at the age of 79 in November 1877.

Works
His published works are:
 British Guiana, London, 1838
 Texas: its claims to be recognized as an independent power, by Great Britain, London, 1839
 Hill coolies; a brief exposition of the deplorable condition of the hill coolies in British Guiana and Mauritius, London, 1840
 Liberté immédiate et absolue, ou esclavage, Paris, 1844 (with G. W. Alexander)
 Introduction to Lewis Tappan's Reply to charges brought against the American and Foreign Anti-Slavery Society (London, 1852)
 See also the great number of articles he published in the Anti-Slavery Reporter.

References

External links
 

1799 births
1877 deaths
English abolitionists
Members of the Legislative Assembly of the Province of Canada from Canada West
People from Kingsbridge
English emigrants to Canada
People from Elgin County